Aneliya Nuneva-Vechernikova (born June 30, 1962) is a retired sprinter from Bulgaria who competed mainly in the 100 metres. In the final of the 100 m at the 1988 Summer Olympic Games she was drawn in lane four alongside the favorite, Florence Griffith-Joyner. She got out of the blocks well and challenged Griffith-Joyner up to about seventy metres when she abruptly pulled a muscle, resulting in her crossing the line in last place and injured. She reached the Olympic final again in 1992, finishing sixth. Her greatest successes were winning silver medals at the 1986 European Championships and 1987 World Indoor Championships. She was trained by Georgi Draganov.

Personal bests
 50 metres - 6.12 (1988)
 60 metres - 7.03 (1987)
 100 metres - 10.85 (1988)
 200 metres - 22.01 (1987)

International competitions

References

1962 births
Living people
Bulgarian female sprinters
Olympic athletes of Bulgaria
Athletes (track and field) at the 1988 Summer Olympics
Athletes (track and field) at the 1992 Summer Olympics
World Athletics Championships athletes for Bulgaria
World Athletics Indoor Championships medalists
European Athletics Championships medalists
Universiade medalists in athletics (track and field)
Universiade silver medalists for Bulgaria
USA Indoor Track and Field Championships winners
Medalists at the 1985 Summer Universiade
Competitors at the 1986 Goodwill Games
Olympic female sprinters
Friendship Games medalists in athletics